The John Jay Homestead State Historic Site is located at 400 Jay Street in Katonah, New York.  The site preserves the 1787 home of Founding Father and statesman John Jay (1745–1829), one of the three authors of The Federalist Papers and the first Chief Justice of the United States.  The property was designated a National Historic Landmark in 1981 for its association with Jay.  The house is open year-round for tours.

Description and history
The John Jay Homestead is located in a rural setting east of the village of Katonah, on the north side of Jay Street (New York State Route 22).  It is a -story gambrel-roofed brick building, with single-story gable-roofed wings to either side.  The main facade is five bays wide, with sash windows arranged symmetrically around the centered entrance.  The center bay is slightly wider than the others, and the entrance is topped by a four-light transom window.  A shed-roof porch shelters the entire span of the first floor, wrapping around in open sections to secondary entrances in the side wings.

John Jay made arrangements in February 1787 with brickmakers and carpenters for the first phase of construction, which was completed in 1790. The second phase, executed in 1800–01, included the extension of the main block to five bays and the addition of the wings (one replacing the first kitchen wing). Jay, whose long and illustrious career included the Continental Congress, drafting of New York's first state constitution, Governor of New York, and Chief Justice of both New York's Supreme Court and the United States Supreme Court, spent his retirement years on this property.

The house remained in the Jay family until 1959, when it was given to Westchester County, which turned it over to the state.  The state undertook the reversal of some alterations made after Jay's ownership, and opened it as a historic site.  In 1977, the non-profit Friends of John Jay Homestead was founded to increase public awareness of the site.  It raises funds and provides volunteer assistance for the Homestead's preservation, restoration and interpretation.

The house was declared a National Historic Landmark in 1981.

Legacy
In 2004, the landmark, known as Bedford House, was added to the African American Heritage Trail of Westchester County, a group of 16 sites which include the Rye African-American Cemetery, Saint Paul's Church National Historic Site and the Jay Estate in Rye.

See also
List of National Historic Landmarks in New York
List of New York State Historic Sites
National Register of Historic Places listings in northern Westchester County, New York

References

External links 

Houses on the National Register of Historic Places in New York (state)
National Historic Landmarks in New York (state)
National Register of Historic Places in Westchester County, New York
New York (state) historic sites
Historic house museums in Westchester County, New York
Biographical museums in New York (state)
Parks in Westchester County, New York
Farm museums in New York (state)
Historic American Buildings Survey in New York (state)
Jay family
Homes of United States Founding Fathers